Dos Bocas Lake is a lake located in the municipalities of Arecibo and Utuado on the island of Puerto Rico. The lake was created from 1937 until it was completed in 1942 with the construction of the Dos Bocas Dam, by the Puerto Rico Electric Power Authority for a hydroelectric power plant. The building of the dam was a New Deal project. It also serves as one of the island's potable water reservoirs. In recent years, silt has accumulated in the lake causing capacity to shrink. Silt has also made some portions of the land inaccessible by boat.

Ferries operated by the Department of Transportation of Puerto Rico provide transportation for residents on Lago Dos Bocas as well as for tourists. Several restaurants are located on the shore of the lake. Other nearby attractions include the Río Abajo State Forest.

Gallery

See also

 List of dams and reservoirs in Puerto Rico

References

USGS-Lago Dos Bocas at Damsite
Proyecto Salon Hogar
New York Times - Travel Puerto Rico
DTOP - Lago Dos Bocas

External links
Lagos y plantas hidroeléctricas de Puerto Rico - Lakes and hydroelectric plants of Puerto Rico

Arecibo, Puerto Rico
Lakes of Puerto Rico
Utuado, Puerto Rico
Reservoirs in Puerto Rico